Denise Cox (née Mruk) is the President of the American Association of Petroleum Geologists. She is the President of Storm Energy, an oil and gas exploration company.

Early life and education 
Cox studied at Binghamton University graduating in 1980. She was awarded the Glenn G. Bartle Award for excellence in geology. She started working at the United States Geological Survey on a 9 well Uranium and Thorium coring project. Recognising she would need further degrees to continue working as a geologist, she moved to the University of Colorado Boulder, and earned a master's degree in 1985. She joined the American Association of Petroleum Geologists in 1984. Her thesis considered the  Permian Capitan Formation.

Career 
After Cox graduated she joined the Marathon Oil Denver Research Center, exploring carbonates and petroleum. She studied the Yates Field reservoir, describing 118 cores in the field. She worked in Littleton, Colorado, Midland, Texas and Denver.

She joined Storm Energy in 2004, taking over from her husband Kurt who became a writer. In 2014 she was appointed President of the Association for Women Geoscientists. In 2015 she was awarded the American Association of Petroleum Geologists Distinguished Service award. Cox began was selected as president elect of the American Association of Petroleum Geologists in 2017, and is the first woman to hold this role.

References 

Living people
American petroleum geologists
American women geologists
20th-century American geologists
20th-century American women scientists
21st-century American geologists
21st-century American women scientists
Binghamton University alumni
University of Colorado Boulder alumni
Year of birth missing (living people)